Carl may refer to:
Carl, Georgia, city in USA
Carl, West Virginia, an unincorporated community
Carl (name), includes info about the name, variations of the name, and a list of people with the name
Carl², a TV series
 "Carl", an episode of television series Aqua Teen Hunger Force
 An informal nickname for a student or alum of Carleton College

CARL may refer to:
Canadian Association of Research Libraries
Colorado Alliance of Research Libraries

See also

Carle (disambiguation)
Charles
Carle, a surname
Karl (disambiguation)
Karle (disambiguation)

ja:カール
zh:卡尔